Red Rider is a Canadian rock band formed in 1975.

Red Rider may also refer to:

 Tom Cochrane and Red Rider, Red Rider's self titled album (1986)
 Red Riders, an Australian rock band
 Red Riders of Canada, 1928 film
 Red Riders, riders in the Tour de Cure
 The Red Horse and Rider, of the four Horsemen of the Apocalypse

See also
Red Ryder (disambiguation)